Why Do the Heathen Rage? may refer to:

 Why Do the Heathen Rage?, 2014, by The Soft Pink Truth
 "Why Do the Heathen Rage?" (short story), 1963, by Flannery O'Connor